Cardwellton, at 103 E. Broadway in Harrodsburg, Kentucky, is a historic house which was begun in about 1785.  It was listed on the National Register of Historic Places in 1977.

The "nucleus of the house" is a log cabin built around 1785.  The main block of the house is believed to have been built around 1820.  Its Greek Revival portico was added between 1831 and 1837.  It includes elements of Greek Revival and Federal architecture.

References

National Register of Historic Places in Mercer County, Kentucky
Federal architecture in Kentucky
Greek Revival architecture in Kentucky

Houses completed in 1785

1785 establishments in Virginia
Log buildings and structures on the National Register of Historic Places in Kentucky
Houses in Mercer County, Kentucky
Harrodsburg, Kentucky
Pre-statehood history of Kentucky